Jean-Marc Grava (born 2 December 1971 in Saint-Denis, France) is a French track and field  athlete who specialises in the 110 meter hurdles. Grava competed in the 2000 Summer Olympics.

References

External links
 

French male hurdlers
Olympic athletes of France
Living people
1971 births
Athletes (track and field) at the 2000 Summer Olympics
Sportspeople from Saint-Denis, Seine-Saint-Denis
20th-century French people